Floyd Sumrall (July 26, 1894 – October 28, 1958) was an American politician. He served as a Democratic member of the Oklahoma House of Representatives.

Life and career 
Sumrall was born in Johnson City, Texas.

In 1949, Sumrall was elected to the Oklahoma House of Representatives, representing Beaver County, Oklahoma. He was speaker pro tempore in 1955.

Sumrall died in October 1958, at the age of 64.

References 

1894 births
1958 deaths
20th-century Members of the Oklahoma House of Representatives
20th-century American politicians
Democratic Party members of the Oklahoma House of Representatives